Popular Paperbacks for Young Adults was an annual list of popular books geared toward young adult readers, collated by the Young Adult Library Services Association (YALSA), which was published from 1988 to 2017. The aim of the list was "to encourage young adults to read for pleasure by presenting to them lists of popular or topical titles which are widely available in paperback and which represent a broad variety of accessible themes and genres". Unlike other lists published by the American Library Association and its subsidiaries, books on the list did not have to be published recently. Researchers, librarians, and educators have used the list to better understand books popular amongst young adults.

History 
YALSA first released the Popular Paperbacks for Young Adults list in 1988. Working with book distributor Baker & Taylor, representatives from YALSA reviewed books available in paperback in five genres: "romance, horror, science fiction, sports, and mystery". In following years, YALSA added more genres to the list (e.g., fantasy, humor, and historical fiction).

Criteria 
To be eligible for the list, books "must be in print and available in paperback", which ensures wider availability across socioeconomic statuses. The judges committee considers the opinions of young adult readers, looking at both young adult and adult books, both fiction and nonfiction. Furthermore, "Popularity is more important than literary quality."

Recipients 
Between 1997 and 2010, YALSA did not select the top ten books annually; instead, they composed longer lists in selected categories. 

The top ten books for 2011 to 2017 are listed below.

References

External links 

 Official website

Lists of books
American Library Association awards
English-language literary awards
Young adult literature awards
American literary awards